Aberdeen Baptist Lui Ming Choi College (abbreviated as ABLMCC,  or abbreviated as 浸中) is a Protestant co-educational government aided secondary school in Ap Lei Chau, Southern District, Hong Kong near Lei Tung station.

History
1974–1978: Pui Chun Secondary School (培真中學)1978–1987: Aberdeen Baptist Secondary School (香港仔浸信會書院)1987–present: Aberdeen Baptist Lui Ming Choi College (香港仔浸信會呂明才書院)

School Motto and Mission
 Greek: AGATHOS & ALETHEIA
 English: Be true and kind
 Aberdeen Baptist Lui Ming Choi College puts forward the spirit of Christianity in education, aiming at developing the wholesome character of pupils. With a balanced and broadly based academic curriculum, the school equips the students with precious knowledge and skills. Aberdeen Baptist Lui Ming Choi College also explores the students' potential to its fullest through our wide-ranging extra-curricular activities.

House system
There are four Houses in Aberdeen Baptist Lui Ming Choi College:
 House of Calvin (Blue)
 House of Luther (Yellow)
 House of Moody (Red)
 House of Spurgeon (Purple)
 House of Schweitzer (Cancelled in 90s.)
 House of Wesley (Cancelled in 90s.)

Notable staff
Lee Wing Kei, a football commentator at Now TV (Hong Kong)

Notable alumni
, a Hong Kong singer
Chan King Yin, a Hong Kong windsurfer

References

External links
 Official website: Aberdeen Baptist Lui Ming Choi College

Protestant secondary schools in Hong Kong
1974 establishments in Hong Kong
Educational institutions established in 1974